Jiří Hřebec (born 19 September 1950) is a retired Czech professional tennis player. He won three singles and four doubles titles on the ATP Tour during his career. Hřebec achieved his highest singles ranking of world No. 25 in April 1974.

Currently, he acts as one of the two trainers of the Czech tennis player Markéta Vondroušová, together with Jan Hernych.

ATP Tour finals

Singles (3–5)

Singles runners-up (5)
1974: Atlanta (lost to Dick Stockton), Düsseldorf (lost to Bernard Mignot)
1975: Memphis (lost to Harold Solomon)
1976: Basel (lost to Jan Kodeš)
1977: Berlin (lost to Paolo Bertolucci)

Doubles titles (4–5)

External links
 
 
 

Czech male tennis players
Czechoslovak male tennis players
People from Teplice
1950 births
Living people
Sportspeople from the Ústí nad Labem Region